The Night of the Long Knives was a purge in which Adolf Hitler and the regime of Nazi Germany targeted members of the Sturmabteilung (SA), the paramilitary wing of the Nazi Party, as well as past opponents of the party. At least 85 people were murdered in the purge, which took place between 30 June and 2 July 1934.

Although most of those killed during the Night of the Long Knives were members of the SA, other victims included close associates of Vice Chancellor Franz von Papen, several Reichswehr (German Army) members – one of whom, General Kurt von Schleicher, was formerly Chancellor of Germany – and their associates; Gregor Strasser, Hitler's former competitor for control of the Nazi Party; at least one person killed in a case of mistaken identity; and several victims killed because they "knew too much".

The total number of victims is heavily disputed between historians; some estimates put the number in the hundreds.

Debate over number of victims

The precise number of victims is disputed and will probably never be known with certainty. During the Purge itself official radio and newspaper reports only gave the names of 10 people killed: the six SA-leaders executed in Stadelheim Prison on June 30; Kurt von Schleicher, a German general and a former Chancellor of the Weimar Republic, and his wife; Karl Ernst, who was wrongly reported to have been shot in Stadelheim, whereas in fact he was shot in the barracks of Hitler's Personal Guard Unit in Berlin Lichterfelde; and Ernst Röhm.

While the German newspapers avoided disclosing the names of further victims of the purge, in the weeks and months to follow, the international press would set out to detail a more comprehensive account of how many people had been killed between June 30 to July 2. They managed to present about 100 names of people allegedly killed, although a number of those eventually turned out to have survived, such as the former SA chief of Berlin Wolf-Heinrich Graf von Helldorf (who  was actually one of the organizers of the purge – e.g. he warned Werner von Alvensleben, Schleicher's go-between to Hitler – but not Schleicher – to spend the fateful weekend at his hunting lodge; and was himself only killed after participating in the fateful 20th of July 1944 coup attempt) and Adolf Morsbach, the head of the cosmopolitan-minded Akademischer Austauschdienst (Academic Exchange Programme), who had instead been sent to a Nazi concentration camp.

Official list of those killed 
Immediately after the events of the purge the Gestapo compiled an official list of those killed at the order of Hitler himself who wished to gain an overall view on the number and identity of those killed in order to prepare the Reichstag speech in which he intended to present his interpretation of the occurrences of June 30 to July 2 to the German public and the world in general, and which he finally delivered on July 13. 
This "Gestapo List" comprised a total of 77 names.

In his Reichstag speech Hitler sub-divided those into 61 persons who had been shot during "the action"; allegedly 13 had died resisting arrest while three committed suicide. In his speech Hitler revealed the names of 11 of those 77 (Ferdinand von Bredow, Georg von Detten, Karl Ernst, Hans Hayn, Edmund Heines, Peter von Heydebreck, Ernst Röhm, Kurt von Schleicher, Gregor Strasser, and Julius Uhl).

However, the list of 77 was far from being complete: Hitler admitted that some excesses had taken place and stated that he had handed over the cases of several people who had been killed as part of unauthorized actions by subordinate organs to the authorities, who were supposed to implement a regular prosecution of the perpetrators. Among those cases who were at first subject to regular investigation and prosecution by the locally responsible Attorney Offices were those of the city clerk Kuno Kamphausen who was murdered at the order of an SS officer who bore a grudge against him for refusing to give a construction permission to his brother and the cases of four Jews and two Communists who were killed without permission from Berlin in the course of arbitrary actions by lower SS echelons in the province of Silesia. In September 1934 Heinrich Himmler – eager to shield his SS men from legal prosecution – managed to convince Hitler to change his mind on the latter six people, whose names as a consequence, were subsequently added to the official list whose killing was to be considered rightful and which now encompassed 83 names.

The list of 77 or 83 names respectively was kept in several copies – which were stored under lock and key – in the Ministry of Justice and the Gestapo Headquarters. After a law entitled "Gesetz über Maßnahmen der Staatsnotwehr" ("Law pertaining to the Measures of Self-Defense of the State") had been passed by the Reich Cabinet on July 3, which declared: "Die zur Niederschlagung hoch- und landesverräterischer Angriffe am 30. Juni, 1. und 2. Juli 1934 vollzogenen Maßnahmen sind als Staatsnotwehr rechtens" ("The measures taken to clamp down on the treasonous attacks of June 30th, July 1st and 2nd are rightful, due to having been acts of self-defense of the State.") it was decided that the killing of everybody on that list was to be considered lawful and that therefore the police and Attorney Offices were prohibited from investigating and prosecuting anyone for those killings. The lists thus were used by the Ministry and the Gestapo as a referential tool which could be consulted to decide, whether requests of relatives and friends of those killed to be given information on the circumstances of death of their beloved ones, or requests to prosecute those responsible for their killing would be answered in the affirmative (people killed and not mentioned on the Gestapo list) or in the negative (people whose names were to be found on the list). The same applied to requests of other state authorities (especially police departments and Attorney Offices) who inquired at the Ministry of Justice or the Gestapo headquarters whether they should open and or continue investigation of a specific killing that had taken place on the three days from June 30 to July 2.

The official list of those killed was first published in 1964 by Heinrich Bennecke (1902–1972) in the appendix of his book Die Reichswehr und der "Röhm-Putsch".

Estimates of people killed in addition to those on the official list

Later research by historians has shown that in addition to those listed by the Gestapo a number of others also had been killed. Heinrich Bennecke complemented the names of the city clerk Kuno Kamphausen from Waldenburg and the music critic Willi Schmid to his reprint of the official Gestapo list, whereupon he concluded that at least 85 people were killed during the purge. Later, Hans Günther Richardi, in his study on the Dachau concentration camp, added the names of four inmates of Dachau (lawyer Julius Adler (1882–1934), worker Erich Gans (1908–1934), Walter Häbich and worker Adam Hereth (1897-1934)), claiming they were murdered by the SS during the purge. In 1993 Otto Gritschneder published a book on the post–World War II prosecution of those involved in the killings which lists 90 names of people killed (adding the doctor and Röhm associate Karl Günther Heimsoth to the list).

Richard J. Evans states that at least 85 people were killed and more than 1000 were arrested. Ian Kershaw also cites the number of deaths at 85. Kershaw notes that "some estimates...put the total number killed at between 150 and 200." William L. Shirer writes in his Rise and Fall of the Third Reich, that "The White Book of the Purge, published by émigrés in Paris claims 401 deaths, but lists only 116 of them. At the 1957 trial in Munich the figure 'more than 1,000' was used." Both of those figures are much higher than the ones most historians of the period rely on, and that Shirer himself was not necessarily citing the figures as accurate, but was simply relaying them in his book. The most recent study on the matter lists by name 89 people who were definitely killed, as well as two other cases of whom it is unclear whether they were murdered during the events or slightly earlier or later.

Partial list of victims

References

Inline citations

General references
 Evans, Richard (2005)The Third Reich in Power. New York: Penguin Group
 Kershaw, Ian (1999) Hitler: 1889–1936: Hubris. New York: W. W. Norton & Company
 Shirer, William L. (1960) The Rise and Fall of the Third Reich. New York: Simon and Schuster

External links 

 Victims of the Night of the Long Knives

 
Adolf Hitler
Deaths by firearm in Germany
LGBT history in Germany
SA
SS